Stefan Kimevski (born 31 December 1990) is a Macedonian handball player who plays for RK Kumanovo.

References
http://ekipa.mk/tineks-prolet-se-zasili-stefan-kimevski-od-metalurg/
http://www.eurohandball.com/ec/chc/men/2015-16/player/542888/StefanKimevski

1990 births
Living people
Macedonian male handball players
Sportspeople from Kumanovo